Todd Griffith (born January 27, 1985) is a Canadian former professional ice hockey forward.

Playing career
Griffith spent time playing Junior Hockey for the Welland Cougars of the Golden Horseshoe Junior Hockey League and the Belleville Bulls, Owen Sound Attack, and Kingston Frontenacs of the Ontario Hockey League.

Griffith began his professional career with the Laredo Bucks of the Central Hockey League during the 2005-06 season.  During the 2006-07 Ice Hockey season, Griffith played 48 games for the Bakersfield Condors of the ECHL and 1 game for the Bridgeport Sound Tigers of the American Hockey League.

During the 2007–08 season, Griffith remained in the ECHL, playing for the Condors and the South Carolina Stingrays.  For the 2008-09 Ice Hockey season, Griffith began the season with the Newcastle Vipers of the EIHL, before leaving the team to join the Johnstown Chiefs of the ECHL.

On May 22, 2009, after being with the Chiefs in the interim, Griffith re-signed with the Newcastle Vipers.  On October 24, 2009, Griffith left the Vipers again, signing with the Laredo Bucks of the Central Hockey League on January 8, 2010.  On November 3, 2010, Griffith was traded by the Bucks to the Texas Brahmas, also of the Central Hockey League, in exchange for Jeff Hazelwood.  On February 4, 2011, for the second time during the 2010-2011 season, Griffith was traded, along with Steven Later, to the Missouri Mavericks in exchange for Sean Muncy.

On September 8, 2011, Griffith re-joined the Bucks by signing with the team.  On December 11, 2011, Griffith signed with the Reading Royals of the ECHL.  On January 29, 2012, Griffith was traded by the Royals to the Toledo Walleye of the ECHL in exchange for Aaron Lewicki and Ryan Blair.  On November 19, 2012, Griffith was released by the Walleye.  On November 24, 2012, Griffith was signed by the Wichita Thunder of the Central Hockey League.

Career statistics

References

External links

Canadian ice hockey forwards
Ice hockey people from Ontario
People from Welland
1985 births
Bridgeport Sound Tigers players
Toledo Walleye players
Reading Royals players
Johnstown Chiefs players
South Carolina Stingrays players
Bakersfield Condors (1998–2015) players
Wichita Thunder players
Laredo Bucks players
Missouri Mavericks players
Fort Worth Brahmas players
Newcastle Vipers players
Kingston Frontenacs players
Owen Sound Attack players
Belleville Bulls players
Living people
Canadian expatriate ice hockey players in England
Canadian expatriate ice hockey players in the United States